Thomas Quinton Donaldson, Jr. (1864–1934) was a United States Army Major General, who was a veteran of numerous American Indian Wars, including the Wounded Knee Massacre. His final command was Fort Sam Houston, Texas.

Early life
He was born into a military family at Greenville, South Carolina. After basic education through local schools, he enrolled at Patrick Military Institute. In 1887, he graduated from the United States Military Academy at West Point.

Wounded Knee and Indian wars
Donaldson was a veteran of the American Indian Wars, having served in the 7th Cavalry Regiment under James W. Forsyth during the 1890 South Dakota Wounded Knee Massacre, and the ensuing White Clay Creek massacre. Donaldson subsequently provided a multi-page hand-written account of the battle at Wounded Knee.

Later military service
He was a veteran of the 1898 Spanish–American War, and saw World War I service at Governors Island in New York, as well as at Tours, France. In 1920, he was made a colonel of the Inspector General’s Department, during the pursuit of draft dodger Grover Cleveland Bergdoll who was later arrested for evading Article 58 of the Selective Service Act of 1917.

Final years

Donaldson was put in charge of Fort Sam Houston in San Antonio, Texas in 1928. Due to his ill health, he was replaced the same year by Major General William Lassiter. He relocated to New York, where he died in 1934.

See also

Pershing House

References

External links
Army at Wounded Knee

1864 births
1934 deaths
People from Greenville, South Carolina
People of the Great Sioux War of 1876
People of the Spanish–American War
People of World War I
United States Army generals of World War I